Glenn Moore (born 20 January 1989) is a British stand-up comedian and presenter.

Career
Moore was a finalist in the 2011 Chortle Student Comedian of the Year Award whilst studying English Literature at the University of Sheffield. After graduating, he worked as a newsreader on a number of radio stations, whilst performing stand-up.

Since September 2017 he has appeared as a panellist on the BBC2 panel show Mock the Week. In October 2017 he joined the Absolute Radio breakfast show as a newsreader and "sidekick". He appeared on Mock the Week again in June 2018  and May 2019, and was later nominated for the most prestigious comedy prize in the UK, the Edinburgh Comedy Award, for his show Glenn Glenn Glenn, How Do You Like It, How Do You Like It. He has since made regular appearances on the programme. In January 2019, Moore appeared in ITVs The Stand Up Sketch Show. and ITV’s Out There. As of 19 November 2020, Moore has started streaming games on Twitch.

Moore announced on Dave Berry's Absolute Radio Breakfast Show on 12 August 2021 that he had got engaged to his girlfriend two days previously.

References

External links

British stand-up comedians
Living people
British male comedians
1989 births
People from Hurstpierpoint
Alumni of the University of Sheffield
21st-century British comedians